Callimetopus bilineatus is a species of beetle in the family Cerambycidae. It was described by Vives in 2015.

References

Callimetopus
Beetles described in 2015